Marty Stuart is the third studio album by the American country music singer of the same name, released in 1986 on Columbia, his only album with that label. He recorded a second album for Columbia titled Let There Be Country, which was not released until 1992.

Overview
The album features 9 songs, four of which were co-written by Stuart. The single "Arlene" made #19 on Hot Country Songs in 1985. "Honky Tonker", "All Because of You", and "Do You Really Want My Lovin'" were also released as singles.  "Beyond the Great Divide" is a Karen Brooks cover from her 1985 album, I Will Dance for You.

Track listing

Personnel
Marty Stuart - Lead Vocals, Rhythm Guitar
Curtis Allen, Kathie Baillie, Alan LeBoeuf, Colleen Peterson - Backing & Harmony Vocals
Jody Maphis - Harmony Vocals, Acoustic Guitar
Duane Eddy, Vince Gill, Biff Watson, Reggie Young - Lead & Rhythm Guitars
Mark O'Connor - Fiddle
Flip Anderson - Piano
Shane Keister - Synthesizer
Bobby Whitlock - Organ
Jim Horn - Saxophone
Paco Shipp - Harmonica
T. Michael Coleman, Ralph Ezell - Bass
W.S. Holland, David Humphreys, Milton Sledge - Drums
Kenny Malone - Percussion

Production
Produced By Curtis Allen; co-production on "Honky Tonker" by Walt Aldridge and Mac McAnally
Recorded & Engineered By Curtis Allen, Jeff Coppage, Ken Criblez, David Ferguson, Mark Hall, Mark Miller, Rocky Schnaars & Al Schulman
Mixed & Remixed By Curtis Allen & Rocky Schnaars
Mastered By Hank Williams

Chart performance

1986 albums
Marty Stuart albums
albums produced by Mac McAnally
Columbia Records albums